The 2021 Croatian Cup Final between Dinamo Zagreb and Istra 1961 was played on 19 May 2021 in Velika Gorica.

Road to the final

Match details

Notes

References

External links
Official website 

2021 Final
GNK Dinamo Zagreb matches
Cup Final
Croatian Football Cup Final